Wadi Shuʿeib is a Neolithic archaeological site in Wadi Shuʿeib, Jordan. Considered a "", it consists of the remains of large village occupied through the Pre-Pottery Neolithic B and Late Neolithic periods.

References 

Neolithic sites of Asia
Archaeological sites in Jordan
Megasites
Pre-Pottery Neolithic B